Common cudweed is a common name for several plants and may refer to:

Euchiton involucratus, native to Australia and New Zealand and naturalized in the United States
Filago vulgaris, native to Europe and naturalized in the United States